Klagenfurt am Wörthersee, usually known as just Klagenfurt, is the capital of the state of Carinthia in Austria. With a population of 103,009 (1 January 2022), it is the sixth-largest city in the country. The city is the bishop's seat of the Roman Catholic Diocese of Gurk-Klagenfurt and home to the University of Klagenfurt, the Carinthian University of Applied Sciences and the Gustav Mahler University of Music.

Geography

Location
The city of Klagenfurt is in southern Austria, near the border with Slovenia. It is in the lower middle of Austria, almost the same distance from Innsbruck in the west as it is from Vienna in the northeast.

It is on the lake Wörthersee and on the Glan river. To the south of the city is the Karawanken mountain range, which separates Carinthia from bordering nations of Slovenia and Italy.

Municipal arrangement
Klagenfurt is a statutory city of Carinthia, and the administrative seat of the district of Klagenfurt-Land, but is a separate district from Klagenfurt-Land. In fact, their licence plates are different (K for the city, KL for the district). Klagenfurt is divided itself into 16 districts:

It is further divided into 25 Katastralgemeinden. They are: Klagenfurt, Blasendorf, Ehrenthal, Goritschitzen, Großbuch, Großponfeld, Gurlitsch I, Hallegg, Hörtendorf, Kleinbuch, Lendorf, Marolla, Nagra, Neudorf, St. Martin bei Klagenfurt, St. Peter am Karlsberg, St. Peter bei Ebenthal, Sankt Peter am Bichl, St. Ruprecht bei Klagenfurt, Stein, Tentschach, Viktring, Waidmannsdorf, Waltendorf, and Welzenegg.

Climate
Klagenfurt has a typical continental climate, with a fair amount of fog throughout the autumn and winter. The rather cold winters are, however, broken up by occasional warmer periods due to foehn wind from the Karawanken mountains to the south.

Name
Carinthia's eminent linguists Primus Lessiak and Eberhard Kranzmayer assumed that the city's name, which literally translates as "Ford of lament" or "ford of complaints", had something to do with the superstitious thought that fateful fairies or demons tend to live around treacherous waters or swamps. In Old Slovene, cviljovec is a place haunted by such a wailing female ghost or cvilya. Thus, they assumed that Klagenfurt's name was a translation made by the German settlers of the original Slovene name of the neighbouring wetland. However, the earliest Slovene mention of Klagenfurt in the form of "v Zelouzi" ("in Celovec", the Slovene name for Klagenfurt), dating from 1615, is 400 years more recent and thus could be a translation from German. The latest interpretation, on the other hand, is that the Old Slovene cviljovec itself goes back to an Italic l'aquiliu meaning a place at or in the water, which would make the wailing-hag theory obsolete.

Scholars had at various times attempted to explain the city's peculiar name: In the 14th century, the abbot and historiographer John of Viktring translated Klagenfurt's name in his Liber certarum historiarum as Queremoniae Vadus, i.e. "ford of complaint", Hieronymus Megiser, Master of the university college of the Carinthian Estates in Klagenfurt and editor of the earliest printed history of the duchy in 1612, believed to have found the origin of the name in a "ford across the River Glan", which, however, is impossible for linguistic reasons. The common people also sought an explanation: A baker's apprentice was accused of theft and executed, but when a few days afterwards the alleged theft turned out to be a mistake and the lad was proved to be totally innocent, the citizens' "lament" ("Klagen") went forth and forth". This story was reported by Aeneas Silvius Piccolomini, who later became Pope Pius II.

In 2007, the city changed its official name to "Klagenfurt am Wörthersee" (i.e., Klagenfurt on Lake Wörth). However, since there are no other settlements by the name of Klagenfurt anywhere, the previous shorter name remains ubiquitous.

History

Foundation

 
Legend has it that Klagenfurt was founded after a group of brave men slayed an abominable winged "lindwurm" from the moors adjoining the lake, which was preying on the nearby duchy. The legend says that a tower at the edge of the moor was erected to watch out for the dragon, and that the dragon was baited using a bull fitted with a chain and hook, which caught the beast's palatal. A village was subsequently founded on the battlesite, which later expanded into a town, while the watchtower made way for a castle. The feat is commemorated by a grandiose 9-ton Renaissance monument in the city centre.

Historically, the place was founded by the Spanheim Duke Herman as a stronghold sited across the commercial routes in the area. Its first mention dates from the late 12th century in a document in which Duke Ulric II. exempted St. Paul's Abbey from the toll charge "in foro Chlagenvurth". That settlement occupied an area that was subject to frequent flooding, so in 1246 Duke Herman's son, Duke Bernhard von Spanheim, moved it to a safer position and is thus considered to be the actual founder of the market place, which in 1252 received a city charter.

Medieval history
In the following centuries, Klagenfurt suffered fires, earthquakes, invasions of locusts, and attacks from Ottomans, and was ravaged by the Peasants' Wars. In 1514, a fire almost completely destroyed the city, and in 1518 Emperor Maximilian I, unable to rebuild it, despite the loud protests of the citizens, ceded Klagenfurt to the Estates, the nobility of the Duchy. Never before had such a thing happened. The new owners, however, brought about an economic renaissance and the political and cultural ascendancy in Klagenfurt. A canal was dug to connect the city to the lake as a supply route for timber to rebuild the city and to feed the city's new moats; the noble families had their town-houses built in the duchy's new capital; the city was enlarged along a geometrical chequer-board lay-out according to the Renaissance ideas of the Italian architect Domenico dell'Allio; a new city centre square, the Neuer Platz, was constructed; and the new fortifications that took half a century to build made Klagenfurt the strongest fortress north of the Alps.

Technical era
In 1809, however, the French troops (under Napoleon) destroyed the city walls, leaving, against a large sum collected by the citizens, only one eastern gate (which was pulled down to make way for traffic some decades later), and the small stretch in the west which is now all that is left of the once grand fortifications. In 1863, the railway connection to St. Veit an der Glan boosted the city's economy and so did the building of the Vienna-Trieste railway that brought to the city an imposing central station (destroyed in World War II) and solidified Klagenfurt as the centre of the region. 

During the 19th century, the city developed into an important centre of Carinthian Slovene culture. Many important Slovene public figures lived, studied or worked in Klagenfurt, among them Anton Martin Slomšek, who later became the first bishop of Maribor and was beatified in 1999, the philologists Jurij Japelj and Anton Janežič, the politician Andrej Einspieler, and the activist Matija Majar. The Slovene national poet France Prešeren also spent a short part of his professional career there. On the initiative of bishop Slomšek, teacher Anton Janežič and vicar Andrej Einspieler on 27 July 1851 in Klagenfurt the Hermagoras Society publishing house was founded, which in 1919 moved to Prevalje and then in 1927 to Celje, but was re-established in Klagenfurt in 1947. Several Slovene language newspapers were also published in the city, among them the Slovenski glasnik. By the late 19th century, however, the Slovene cultural and political influence in Klagenfurt had declined sharply, and by the end of World War I, the city showed an overwhelmingly Austrian German character.

Nevertheless, in 1919, the city was occupied by the Army of the Kingdom of Serbs, Croats and Slovenes and claimed for the newly founded South-Slav kingdom. In 1920, the Yugoslav occupying forces withdrew from the town centre, but remained in its southern suburbs, such as Viktring and Ebenthal. They eventually withdrew after the Carinthian Plebiscite in October 1920, when the majority of voters in the Carinthian mixed-language Zone A decided to remain part of Austria.

World War II
In 1938, Klagenfurt's population suddenly grew by more than 50% through the incorporation of the town of St. Ruprecht and the municipalities of St. Peter, Annabichl, and St. Martin but during World War II, the city was bombed 41 times. The bombs killed 612 people, completely destroyed 443 buildings and damaged 1,132 others.

From the beginning of 1945, when the end of the war was rather obvious, numerous talks among representatives of democratic pre-1934 organisations had taken place, which later extended to high-ranking officers of the Wehrmacht and officials of the administration. Even representatives of the partisans in the hills south of Klagenfurt were met who, in view of the strong SS-forces in Klagenfurt, agreed not to attempt to take the city by force, but upheld the official declaration that south-eastern Carinthia was to be a Yugoslav possession.

In order to avoid further destruction and a major bloodshed, on 3 May 1945 General Löhr of Army Group E (Heeresgruppe E) agreed to declare Klagenfurt an "open city"  "in case Anglo-American forces should attack the city", a declaration that was broadcast several times and two days later also published in the Kärntner Nachrichten.

On 7 May 1945, a committee convened in the historic Landhaus building of the Gau authorities in order to form a Provisional State government, and one of the numerous decisions taken was a proclamation to the "People of Carinthia". This proclamation included the reporting of the resignation of the Gauleiter and Reichsstatthalter Friedrich Rainer, the transfer of power to the new authorities, and an appeal to the people to decorate their homes with Austrian or Carinthian colours. The proclamation was printed in the Kärntner Zeitung of 8 May. When on the following day, Yugoslav military demanded of Klagenfurt's new mayor that he remove the Austrian flag from the city hall and fly the Yugoslav flag instead, the acting British Town Officer Captain Watson immediately prohibited this, but also ordered that the Austrian flag be taken down. Accompanied by a guerilla troop carrying a machine pistol, a Yugoslav emissary appeared on the same day in the Landesregierung building, demanding of the Acting State Governor Piesch repeal the order to take down the Yugoslav flag, which was ignored.

On 8 May 1945, 9:30 a.m., British troops of the Eighth Army under General McCreery entered Klagenfurt and were met in front of Stauderhaus by the new democratic city and state authorities. All the strategic positions and important buildings were immediately seized, and Major General Horatius Murray was taken to General Noeldechen for the official surrender of the 438th German Division. Three hours later, groups of partisan forces arrived on a train they had seized in the Rosental valley the day before, at the same time as Yugoslav regular forces of the IVth army. Both of these forces made their way through the city's streets which were jammed with tens of thousands of Volksdeutsche refugees, and masses of soldiers of all the nationalities that had been fighting under German command and were now fleeing the Russians. These partisan and Yugoslav regular forces claimed the city and the surrounding South Carinthian land, establishing the Komanda staba za Koroška, which would be named the "Commandantura of the Carinthian Military Zone" under Major Egon Remec.  On Neuer Platz—renamed Adolf Hitler Platz in 1938—British armoured vehicles are said to have faced allied Yugoslav ones in a hostile way, which would have been a curious spectacle for the liberated citizens, but this is probably one more of those modern legends.

Several days passed before, under British pressure with US diplomatic backing, the Yugoslav troops withdrew from the city proper, not before establishing a parallel Carinthian-Slovene civil administration (the Carinthian National Council) which was presided over by Franc Petek. However, protected by British soldiers, the members of the Provisional State Government went about devising a comprehensive programme to cover the new political, sociological, and economic outlooks in the land, which would serve the British military authorities. Rapid financial assistance and the restitution of property to the victims of the Nazi regime was necessary. This posed a problem, because one of the first actions of the British had been to confiscate all the property of the Nazi Party, as well as to freeze their bank accounts and to block their financial transfers. It took months before basic communication and public transport, mail service and supply were working again, to some extent at least. During the years that followed these turbulent days, a major part of the British Eighth Army, which in July 1945 was re-constituted as British Troops in Austria (BTA), had their headquarters in Klagenfurt - as Carinthia, together with neighbouring Styria, formed part of the British occupation zone in liberated Austria, which remained to be the case until 26 October 1955.

Modern history
In 1961, Klagenfurt became the first city in Austria to adopt a pedestrian zone. The idea of a friendly twinning of cities in other countries began with the very first-ever city partnership between Klagenfurt and Wiesbaden, Germany, as early as 1930. This was followed up by numerous city partnerships, with the result that in 1968, Klagenfurt was honoured with the title of "European City of the Year". Klagenfurt has also been awarded the prestigious Europa Nostra Diploma of Merit (an award for the exemplary restoration and redevelopment of its ancient centre) a total of three times, which is a record for a European city.

In 1973, Klagenfurt absorbed four more adjacent municipalities: Viktring, with its grand Cistercian monastery; Wölfnitz; Hörtendorf; and St. Peter am Bichl. The addition of these municipalities increased the population of Klagenfurt to about 90,000.

Population
As of January 2020, there were 101,403 people whose principal residence was Klagenfurt.

In 2019, there were around 20,000 people who were born outside the country living in Klagenfurt, corresponding to around 20% of the city's population.

Sights

The Old City, with its central Alter Platz (Old Square) and the Renaissance buildings with their charming arcaded courtyards are a major attraction.

Notable landmarks also include:
 The Lindworm fountain of 1593, with a Hercules added in 1633
Landhaus, Palace of the Estates, now the seat of the State Assembly
 the Baroque cathedral, built by the then Protestant Estates of Carinthia
Viktring Abbey
Wörthersee Stadion Football stadium
Minimundus, the "small world on lake Wörthersee"
 The Kreuzbergl Nature Park, with a viewing tower and observatory
 The small but attractive botanical garden at the foot of Kreuzbergl, with a mining museum attached
 The University Campus at the city's west end, with the adjacent Lakeside Science & Technology Park  
 Wörthersee (the warmest of the large Alpine lakes) with Europe's largest non-sea beach and lido, taking 12,000 bathers on a summer day
 Maria Loretto peninsula, with its newly renovated stately home (recently acquired by the city from the Carinithian noble family of the Rosenbergs)
 Tentschach and Hallegg castles

Economy

Klagenfurt is the economic centre of Carinthia, with 20% of the industrial companies. In May 2001, there were 63,618 employees in 6,184 companies here. 33 of these companies employed more than 200 people. The prevalent economic sectors are light industry, electronics, and tourism. There are also several printing offices.

The most important market place in Klagenfurt since 1948 is Benedikterplatz, formerly known as Herzogplatz. There is a market at Benediktenplatz twice a week with a diverse selection of food available for sale.

As well as the historical market, there are several shopping centres in Klagenfurt. The City-Arkaden shopping centre, founded in 2006, is located at the northern part of the city centre. The shopping centre has 120 businesses in a total floor area of 30 thousand square metres, and is one of the largest shopping centres in Carinthia. At the time of its foundation, it was one of the first shopping centres with a central arcade in the entire country of Austria.

The second-largest shopping centre in the city is Südpark, founded in 1998 and located near the Klagenfurt central station.

Transport

Klagenfurt Airport is a primary international airport with connections to several major European cities and holiday resorts abroad.

The Klagenfurt central station is located south of the city centre.

The city is situated at the intersection of the A2 and S37 motorways. The A2 autobahn runs from Vienna via Graz and Klagenfurt to Villach and further to the state border of Italy. The S37 freeway runs from Vienna via Bruck an der Mur and Sankt Veit an der Glan to Klagenfurt. The Loibl Pass highway B91 goes to Ljubljana, the capital of Slovenia, which is only  from Klagenfurt.

The volume of traffic in Klagenfurt is high (motorisation level: 572 cars/1000 inhabitants in 2007). Service on the city's streetcar (tram) system, as well as its trolleybus system, ended in April 1963. In the 1960s, Klagenfurt was meant to become a car-friendly city, with many wide roads. A motorway was even planned which was to cross the city partly underground, but which now by-passes the city to the north. The problem of four railway lines from north, west, south, and east meeting at the central station south of the city centre and strangulating city traffic has been eased by a considerable number of underpasses on the main arteries. Nevertheless, despite 28 bus lines, traffic jams are frequent nowadays as in most cities of similar size. Ideas of a rapid transport system using the existing railway rails, of an elevated cable railway to the football stadium, or of a regular motorboat service on the Lend Canal from the city centre to the lake have not materialized. But for those who fancy leisurely travel there is a regular motorboat and steamer service on the lake connecting the resorts on Wörthersee. During severe winters, which no longer occur regularly, it might be faster to cross the frozen lake on skates.

Culture

There is a civic theatre-cum-opera house with professional companies, a professional symphony orchestra, a university of music and a concert hall. There are musical societies such as Musikverein (founded in 1826) or Mozartgemeinde, a private experimental theatre company, the State Museum, a modern art museum and the Diocesan museum of religious art; the Artists' House, two municipal and several private galleries, a planetarium in Europa Park, literary institutions such as the Robert Musil House, and a reputable German-literature competition awarding the prestigious Ingeborg Bachmann Prize.

Klagenfurt is the home of a number of small but fine publishing houses, and several papers or regional editions are also published here including dailies such as "Kleine Zeitung" and "Kärntner Krone".

Klagenfurt is a popular vacation spot, with mountains both to the south and north, numerous parks and a series of 23 stately homes and castles on its outskirts. In summer, the city is home to the Altstadtzauber (The Magic of the Old City) festival.

The city is home to the University of Klagenfurt and hosts a campus of the Fachhochschule Kärnten (Carinthia University of Applied Sciences), a college of education for primary and secondary teacher training and further education of teachers as well as a college of general further education (VHS) and two institutions of further professional and vocational education (WIFI and BFI). Among other Austrian educational institutions, there is a Slovene language Gymnasium (established in 1957) and a Slovene language commercial high school. Several Carinthian Slovene cultural and political associations are also based in the city, including the Hermagoras Society, the oldest Slovene publishing house founded in Klagenfurt in 1851.

Annual events
Klagenfurt hosts several events annually.
Annual lectures and discussions of the international Ingeborg Bachmann awards ceremony for literature.
Annual international summer music concert and Gustav Mahler awards ceremony at the former monastery in Viktring.
"Wörtheresee Classics" festival at the concert house.
World Bodypainting Festival, the most famous body painting festival in the world, held at the Norbert Artner park in July.
The so-called "Kontaktna-leča – Kontaklinse-Festival" youth culture organised by Slovenian students, held in Klagenfurt since 1981.
"Altstadtzauber" ("Old Town Magic") music and arts festival on the second weekend of August.
The so-called Klagenfurt Festival held since 2020.
A Christmas market held annually at Christmas time.

Education

Tertiary

 University of Klagenfurt
 Klagenfurt Campus of Fachhochschule (FH) Kärnten, Carinthia University of Applied Sciences (CUAS)
 Pädagogische Hochschule Viktor Frankl, a college of education
 Health Science Centre with Academy for Midwifery and hospital-based Nursing School at the Klagenfurt State Hospital
 Gustav Mahler University of Music

Secondary
A number of general high schools such as 
 Europa-Gymnasium, Austria's second-oldest
 BG/BRG Mössingerstraße
 BRG Klagenfurt-Viktring with emphasis on arts (music and drawing)
 ORG St. Ursula, a private Catholic institutionf
 a Slovene-language Gymnasium
and senior high schools offering general-cum-professional education: 
 Two schools of Engineering: HTL Lastenstrasse and HTL Mössingerstraße
 Two commercial high schools: Handelsakademie No. 1 and No. 2
 a Slovene-language Commercial High School ("Handelsakademie")
 a high school of catering, fashion and design
 a school of pre-school education
 a school of Alpine agriculture and nutrition science
 a school of social management of the Caritas charity

Further education
 College of Further Education Volkshochschule
 Technical Training Institute of the Trade Unions, Berufsförderungsinstitut (BFI)
 Technical Training Institute of the Chamber of Commerce, Wirtschaftsförderungsinstitut (WIFI)
 evening schools (Gymnasium and Schools of Mechanical and Electrical Engineering)

Others
 Waldorf School
 a school for social workers operated by the Austrian Caritas Charity
 Carinthian State School of Fire Control

Sports
The Austrian ice-hockey record-champion EC KAC is one of the best known sports clubs in Austria. The "Eishockey Club Klagenfurter Athletiksport Club" has won the Austrian Championship 30 times and its fans come from all over Carinthia.
The Bundesliga football club SK Austria Kärnten was based in Klagenfurt, with their second-tier phoenix club Austria Klagenfurt also playing there.
Klagenfurt hosts the Start/Finish of the Austrian Ironman Contest,  swim,  cycling, and a  run, part of the WTC Ironman series, which culminates in the Hawaii World Championships.

The World (European) Rowing Championships were held on the Wörthersee in 1969.

One of the FIVB's Beach Volleyball Grand Slams takes place in Klagenfurt every July and is almost always one of Austria's biggest celebrations during the year.  Beach volleyball is popular in Austria even though the country is landlocked. Austrian players Clemens Doppler, Florian Gosch, and Alexander Horst, who are perennial European powerhouses take part every year.  The 2009 champions of this tournament were the 2008 Beijing gold medal team from the US, Phil Dalhausser and Todd Rogers.

Klagenfurt also hosted three games during the UEFA Euro 2008 Championships in the recently built Hypo-Arena. Klagenfurt was also a contender for the 2006 Winter Olympics
and is home to an American Football team, the Carinthian Black Lions, competing in the First League of the Austrian Football League.  The Black Lions attract fans from all over Carinthia, playing home games in both Klagenfurt and Villach.

Notable natives and residents

Nobility, soldiers and diplomats 
 Odilo Globocnik (1904 - 1945), a leading Nazi official, born in Trieste, but later resided in Klagenfurt
 Bernhard von Spanheim (1176 or 1181 – 1256), House of Sponheim, was Duke of Carinthia for 54 years from 1202
 Maximilian Daublebsky Freiherr von Sterneck zu Ehrenstein (1829 in Klagenfurt – 1897) Admiral Austro-Hungarian Navy 
 Prince Ludwig Gaston Klemens Maria of Saxe-Coburg and Gotha (1870 in Ebenthal – 1942, in Innsbruck), prince of the House of Saxe-Coburg and Gotha-Koháry lived in Brazil until 1889
 Countess Lucy Christalnigg von und zu Gillitzstein (1872–1914), Red Cross worker and motor racing driver
 Hanns Albin Rauter (1895 in Klagenfurt – 1949), SS-general in Nazi-occupied Netherlands, executed war criminal
 Ernst Lerch (1914 in Klagenfurt – 1997) ran Operation Reinhard, the mass murder of Jews in the General Government
 Wolfgang Petritsch (born 1947 in Klagenfurt) diplomat, former UN High Representative for Bosnia and Herzegovina
 Valentin Inzko (born 1949 in Klagenfurt) Austrian diplomat, Carinthian Slovene, High Representative for Bosnia and Herzegovina
 Ursula Plassnik (born 1956 in Klagenfurt) Austrian diplomat and politician, Foreign Minister of Austria from 2004 to 2008
 Prince Stefan of Liechtenstein (born 1961 in Klagenfurt), Liechtenstein's Ambassador Extraordinary and Plenipotentiary to Germany

Public service 
 Johann von Viktring (c. 1270 – 1347) late medieval chronicler and political advisor to the Duchy of Carinthia
 Jurij Japelj (1744–1807) Slovene Jesuit priest, translator, and philologist
 Matija Majar (1809–1892), Carinthian Slovene Roman Catholic priest and political activist, went to school in Klagenfurt
 Andrej Einspieler (1813–1888) Slovene politician, Roman Catholic priest, journalist, "father of the Carinthian Slovenes"
 Anton Janežič (1828–1869) Carinthian Slovene linguist, philologist, literary historian, went to school in Klagenfurt
 Emanuel Alexander Herrmann (1839 in Klagenfurt – 1902) national economist, originated the pre-paid postal card
 Felix Ermacora (1923–1995) human rights expert 
 Heinz Nittel (1931–1981) politician in Vienna's city administration, murdered
 Karl Matthäus Woschitz (born 1937 in Sankt Margareten im Rosental) Austrian theologian and bible scholar
 Rudolf "Rudi" Vouk (born 1965 in Klagenfurt) Austrian lawyer, politician, human rights activist

Science and architecture 
 Lorenz Chrysanth von Vest (1776 in Klagenfurt – 1840) Austrian physician and botanist
 Friedrich Martin Josef Welwitsch (1806 in Maria Saal – 1872) Austrian explorer, botanist, discovered Welwitschia mirabilis
 Josef Stefan (1835 in Klagenfurt – 1893) Carinthian Slovene physicist, mathematician, poet of the Austrian Empire
 Hubert Leitgeb (1835 in Portendorf – 1888) Austrian botanist
 Gustav Adolf Franz Xavier Gugitz (1836 in Klagenfurt – 1882) Austrian architect
 Markus von Jabornegg zu Gamsenegg und Moderndorf (1837 in Klagenfurt – 1910) Austrian government official, botanist
 Roland Rainer (1910 in Klagenfurt – 2004) Austrian architect
 Hubert Petschnigg (1913 in Klagenfurt – 1997) Austrian architect
 Karl Robatsch (1929 in Klagenfurt – 2000) botanist & Austrian chess player 
 Günther Domenig (1934 in Klagenfurt – 2012) Austrian architect
 Hermann Mittelberger (1935 in Klagenfurt – 2004) Austrian Indo-Europeanist
 Peter Manfred Gruber (born 1941 in Klagenfurt) Austrian mathematician working in geometric number theory
 Helmut Wautischer (born 1954 in Klagenfurt) Austrian philosopher, senior philosophy lecturer at Sonoma State University
 Andreas Bernkop-Schnürch (born 1965 in Klagenfurt) Austrian scientist, pharmacist, entrepreneur, inventor and professor
 Markus Müller (born 1967 in Klagenfurt) Austrian pharmacologist
 Ingo Zechner (born 1972 in Klagenfurt) philosopher and historian

Writers 
 Robert Musil (1880 in Klagenfurt – 1942) Austrian philosophical writer
 Wolf In der Maur (1924 in Klagenfurt – 2005), Austrian journalist and editor
 Ingeborg Bachmann (1926 in Klagenfurt – 1973) Austrian poet and author
 Ernst Alexander Rauter (1929 in Klagenfurt – 2006)  Austrian author, journalist and language critic
 Gert Jonke (1946 in Klagenfurt – 2009) Austrian poet, playwright and novelist
 Vinko Ošlak (born 1947) Slovene author, essayist, translator, columnist and esperantist, lived in Klagenfurt
 Antonia Rados (born 1953 in Klagenfurt) Austrian television journalist working for RTL Television
 Monika Czernin (born 1965), writer, screenwriter and film director
 Isabella Krassnitzer (born 1967 in Klagenfurt) Austrian journalist, radio and television presenter

Musicians 
 Konrad Ragossnig (born 1932 in Klagenfurt) classical guitarist and lutenist
 Udo Jürgens (1934 in Klagenfurt – 2014) Austrian-Swiss singer, won the Eurovision Song Contest 1966 for Austria
 Dagmar Koller (born 1939 in Klagenfurt) Austrian singer and actress
 Penny McLean (born Gertrude Wirschinger 1948 in Klagenfurt) Austrian born singer in Silver Convention
 Wolfgang Puschnig (born 1956 in Klagenfurt) Austrian jazz musician (saxophone, flute, bass clarinet) and composer
 Christopher Hinterhuber (born 1973 in Klagenfurt) Austrian classical pianist
 Benjamin Ziervogel (born 1983 in Klagenfurt) Austrian violinist, concertmaster of RTV Slovenia Symphony Orchestra
 Anna Kohlweis (born 1984 in Klagenfurt) Austrian singer-songwriter and artist, also known as Paper Bird and Squalloscope
 Naked Lunch, a band from Klagenfurt founded in 1991, started as an alternative rock band

Arts 
 Franciszek Ksawery Lampi (1782 in Klagenfurt – 1852), Polish Romantic painter
 Mirella Bentivoglio (born 1922 in Klagenfurt) Italian sculptor, poet, performance artist and curator
 Wolfgang Hollegha (born 1929 in Klagenfurt) Austrian painter
 Hannes Heinz Goll (1934 in Klagenfurt – 1999) Austrian sculptor, printmaker and painter, worked mainly in Colombia
 James Aubrey (1947 in Klagenfurt – 2010) famous British actor
 Sissy Höfferer (born 1955 in Klagenfurt) Austrian television actress
 Danny Nucci (born 1968 in Klagenfurt) Austrian-American actor
 Maria Petschnig (born 1977 in Klagenfurt) is an Austrian artist and filmmaker 
 Larissa-Antonia Marolt (born 1992 in Klagenfurt) Austrian fashion model and actress

Sport 
 Andre Burakovsky (born 1995) ice hockey player
 Anton Pein (born 1967 in Klagenfurt) Austrian darts player
 Horst Skoff (1968 in Klagenfurt – 2008) professional tennis player from Austria
 Stephanie Graf (born 1973 in Klagenfurt) Austrian former middle-distance runner
 Dieter Kalt, Jr. (born 1974 in Klagenfurt) Austrian former professional ice hockey player
 Stefan Lexa (born 1976 in Klagenfurt) Austrian retired football player
 Stefan Koubek (born 1977 in Klagenfurt) retired left handed tennis player from Austria
 Thomas Pöck (born 1981 in Klagenfurt) ice hockey player

Gallery

International relations

Twin towns – sister cities
Klagenfurt is twinned with the following towns and cities.

References

Notes

Bibliography
 Dieter Jandl, A brief history of Klagenfurt, revised edition, Klagenfurt: Heyn 2007, 
 [http://bookshop.blackwell.co.uk/jsp/welcome.jsp?action=search&type=isbn&term=0810117967 Uwe Johnson, A trip to Klagenfurt. In the footsteps of Ingeborg Bachmann], transl. by Damion Searls, Evanston, Ill. : Northwestern University Press, 2004  Richard Rainier Randall, The Political Geography of the Klagenfurt Plebiscite Area, PhD thesis, Clark University, Worcester, Mass.  1955
 Karl R. Stadler, Austria,  London: Benn 1971 
 Nikolai Tolstoy, The Klagenfurt Conspiracy . War crimes & diplomatic secrets, in: Encounter vol. 60 (1983) no. 5
 Anthony Cowgill, Christopher Booker et al., Interim Report on an Enquiry into the Repatriation of Surrendered Enemy Personnel to The Soviet Union and Yugoslavia from Austria in May 1945 and The Alleged 'Klagenfurt Conspiracy','' Stroud, Gloucestershire, Royal United Service Institute for Defence Studies, 1988

External links

 Klagenfurt info
 Statistisches Jahrbuch der Landeshauptstadt Klagenfurt 2007, S. XXIX.  Statistical Yearbook 2007 of the Capital City of Klagenfurt (PDFin German)
 Slovene postage stamp 150th anniversary of Hermagoras 
  Speech of the President of Slovenia in Klagenfurt on the 150th anniversary of Hermagoras 

 
Austrian state capitals
Cities and towns in Carinthia (state)
Districts of Carinthia (state)